In American football, a punt is a kick that is performed after a player (most often a punter) drops the ball from their hands and kicks it prior to it hitting the ground. Record keeping for punting yards in the National Football League (NFL) goes as far back as 1939. 

To be eligible for career-long rankings, a player must have a minimum of 250 punts. Although he never led the league in punting yards for a single-season, Jeff Feagles' longevity propelled him to become the career punting yards leader, with 71,211. Feagles is the only punter to eclipse 70,000 career punting yards, and only three other punters have surpasssed the 60,000 mark. He also set the career record for total punts in 2005, when he recorded his 1,368th, surpassing Sean Landeta. He later retired with 1,713 career punts, still the NFL record.

With 1,168 punts and 52,868 punting yards for the Baltimore Ravens, Sam Koch has the most of both statistics for any individual franchise. Ranked 7th all-time in career punting yards, Koch is also the highest-ranked punter to have spent his entire career with a single team. The Kansas City Chiefs are the only other franchise to have a player punt for over 50,000 yards during their tenure with the team. 

Shane Lechler, who ranks second to Feagles in both total punts and punting yards, is the NFL's all-time leader in yards per punt (47.6). Lechler is also the only punter to lead two different franchises (the Las Vegas Raiders and Houston Texans) in career punting yards. 

Net yards per punt, or net average, as opposed to a player's gross average, is considered a more revealing indicator of a punter's performance. This is due to the net average taking into account return yardage or a touchback on the punt which are subtracted from the gross punting yards, or how far the ball travels on a punt. Logan Cooke holds the record for career net average (43.1), although Tommy Davis holds the unofficial record (44.5), having played prior to 1976, when the statistic began being officially tracked.

Career punting yards leaders

Career punting average leaders

Yards per punt

Net yards per punt

Career franchise punting yards leaders

See also
List of National Football League annual punting yards leaders
List of National Football League career punts leaders

Notes

References

Punting yards leaders
National Football League records and achievements
National Football League lists